The Occidental Handicap was an American Thoroughbred horse race held annually from 1899 through 1909 at Gravesend Race Track, Gravesend, Brooklyn, New York. A race for horses of either sex age three and older, it was contested on dirt over a distance of a mile and one-eighth until its final running when it became a mile and one-quarter selling race.

Historical notes 
First run on September 16, 1899, the Occidental Handicap would come to be regarded as an important stakes race on the New York fall schedule. 
 Among the winners was the famous "mudder" Herbert who won back-to-back editions in 1901 and 1902.  The race's only two-time winner, Herbert would duplicate that feat with wins in the Merchants and Citizens Handicap in 1901 and 1902. 

In her September 26, 1907 win, the three-year-old filly Gold Lady set a new track record for a mile and one-eighth with a time of 1:51 3/5.

Demise of the Occidental Handicap
The status of the race as being important to the Gravesend track's fall racing schedule would change on June 11, 1908, when the Republican controlled New York Legislature under Governor Charles Evans Hughes passed the Hart–Agnew anti-betting legislation. The owners of Gravesend Race Track, and other racing facilities in New York State, struggled to stay in business without income from betting. Racetrack operators had no choice but to drastically reduce the purse money being paid out which resulted in the Occidental Handicap offering a purse in 1909 that was less than one-third of what it had been in earlier years. These small purses made horse racing unprofitable and impossible for even the most successful horse owners to continue in business. As such, for the 1910 racing season management of the Gravesend facility dropped some of its stakes races and used the purse money to bolster its most important events.
Although a February 21, 1913 ruling by the New York Supreme Court, Appellate Division saw horse racing return in 1913, it was too late for the Occidental Handicap.

Records
Speed record:
 1:41.60 @ 1 1-8 miles: Gold Lady (1907)

Most wins:
 2 - Herbert (1901, 1902)

Most wins by a jockey:
 2 - Lewis Smith (1901, 1902)
 2 - Eddie Dugan (1908, 1909)

Most wins by a trainer:
 2 - Julius J. Bauer (1899, 1908)
 2 - Walter C. Rollins (1901, 1902)
 2 - Walter B. Jennings (1904, 1905)

Most wins by an owner:
 2 - Bromley & Co. (1899, 1908)
 2 - Walter C. Rollins (1901, 1902)
 2 - Walter B. Jennings (1904, 1905)

Winners

References

Discontinued horse races in New York City
Open mile category horse races
Recurring sporting events established in 1899
Recurring sporting events disestablished in 1909
Gravesend Race Track